PureBoys (stylized PureBOYS from 2007–08) was a Japanese project group formed in 2007 by Ameba. PureBoys was conceived as an endorsement featuring young actors from various talent agencies to promote Ameba's blogging service, Ameba Blogs, but soon included several acting and singing projects for the members. The group's music is released through the indie label Pull Up Records. After releasing several singles and stage plays together, PureBoys disbanded in 2012.

History

The group formed in June 2007
and opened its official website July 20, 2007.

Released of its debut single Kampai Je T'aime September 26, 2007,
released Back Stage File #1 DVD October 3, 2007,
staging of Act.1: 7Cheers! ~Jibun to iu Daichi Kara~ October 3–8, 2007
re-release of Kampai Je T'aime CD October 10, 2007,
released First Photobook November 16, 2007,
released 7Cheers! DVD December 21, 2007.

On December 28, 2007 it announced two new members: Sakimoto and Sato.
On March 21, 2008 Takiguchi, Kato and Nakayama announced their graduation from the group via blog entry.
March 28, 2008 was the graduation ceremony during the PureBOYS internet broadcast show Harajuku AmeSuta Gakuen.

released second single Kimi no Te / Psyche na Heart June 25, 2008,
staging of Act.2: 7Dummy's Blues August 20–27, 2008.

On August 31, 2008 Takeda graduated from PureBOYS
and on September 12, 2008 Itogi was introduced as the newest member.

released 7Dummy's Blues DVD November 5, 2008,
released third single CAUTION June 10, 2009
and released of fourth single Zenkaidansu November 25, 2009.

On September 13, 2012, PureBoys announced through their official website that they were disbanding after their final event on October 27.

Members

Current

Former

Discography

Studio albums

Singles

DVDs

References

External links
 
 PureBoys official AmebaBlog index

Japanese boy bands
Japanese male actors
Japanese pop music groups
Musical groups established in 2007
Musical groups disestablished in 2012
Musical groups from Tokyo